Carlo Verri (1743–1823) was an Italian politician.

Born in Milan, he was the brother of literates Alessandro and Pietro Verri. During the Napoleonic suzerainty in Italy, he was deputy and prefect in the Italian Republic and the Kingdom of Italy. In the town of Biassono there is now a museum dedicated to him .

He died at Verona.

External links
 
 

1743 births
1823 deaths
Politicians from Milan